Rancho Magaña Airstrip is a privately owned public-use dirt airstrip located North of San Quintín, Municipality of Ensenada, Baja California, Mexico, just on the East side of the Federal Highway 1. The airstrip is used solely for general aviation  purposes. The MAG code is used as identifier.

External links
Rancho Magaña Airstrip Info
Baja Bush Pilots forum about Rancho Magaña Airstrip

Airports in Baja California